Al-Ittihad ( meaning "the Union") is a Palestinian town in the Ramallah and al-Bireh Governorate, created in 1997 as a merger of three towns Beitillu,  Deir 'Ammar and Jammala.  According to the Palestinian Central Bureau of Statistics, it had a population of approximately 6,803 in 2007.

Location of Al-Ittihad
Al-Itihad is bordered by Kobar and Al-Zaytouneh to the east, Deir Abu Mash'al, Deir Nidham  and 'Abud to the north, Shabtin and Deir Qaddis  to the west, and Ras Karkar, Kharbatha Bani Harith, Al-Zaytouneh and Al Janiya to the south.

Beitillu

 Beitillu is a Palestinian town located in the Ramallah and al-Bireh Governorate in the northern West Bank, 19 kilometers Northwest of Ramallah. According to the Palestinian Central Bureau of Statistics, it had a population of approximately 3,083 in mid-year 2006

Deir 'Ammar

Deir 'Ammar is a Palestinian town in the Ramallah and al-Bireh Governorate, located 17 kilometers Northwest of Ramallah in the northern West Bank. According to the Palestinian Central Bureau of Statistics (PCBS), the town had a population of 2,414 inhabitants in mid-year 2006.

Jammala

Jammala is a Palestinian town in the Ramallah and al-Bireh Governorate, located 18 kilometers Northwest of Ramallah in the northern West Bank. According to the Palestinian Central Bureau of Statistics (PCBS), the town had a population of 1,453 inhabitants in mid-year 2006.

Post-1967
After the 1995 accords, 41.2% of Al-Ittihad's land was classified as Area B and the remaining 58.8% as Area C. Israel has confiscated 858 dunams of land from Al-Ittihad for the construction of 4 Israeli settlements: Nahl'iel, Na'aleh, Talmon and Hallamish.

References

External links
Official Website
AL-Itihad Town (Fact Sheet),  Applied Research Institute - Jerusalem (ARIJ)
Al-Itihad Town Profile (Beitillu, Jammala & Deir 'Ammar), ARIJ  
Al-Itihad aerial photo, ARIJ 
Survey of Western Palestine, Map 14:  IAA, Wikimedia commons

Towns in the West Bank
Ramallah and al-Bireh Governorate
1997 establishments in the Palestinian territories
Municipalities of West Bank